Eucarta is a genus of moths of the family Noctuidae. The genus was erected by Julius Lederer in 1857.

Species
 Eucarta actides (Staudinger, 1888)
 Eucarta amethystina (Hübner, [1803])
 Eucarta arcta (Lederer, 1853)
 Eucarta curiosa (Draudt, 1950)
 Eucarta fasciata (Butler, 1878)
 Eucarta fuscomaculata (Bremer & Grey, 1853)
 Eucarta griseata (Leech, 1900)
 Eucarta virgo (Treitschke, 1835) - silvery gem

References

Amphipyrinae